John Yancey may refer to:

John Yancey (tennis) (born 1970), American professional tennis player
John F. Yancey (1826-1903), Yellowstone National Park concessionaire
John H. Yancey (1918-1986), highly decorated United States Marine
Illa J, born John Derek Yancey, American hip hop musician